Jenštejn is a municipality and village in Prague-East District in the Central Bohemian Region of the Czech Republic. It has about 1,400 inhabitants.

Administrative parts
The village of Dehtáry is an administrative part of Jenštejn.

Etymology
The original name of the village and the local castle was Jencenstein, meaning "Jenc's stone". It was later distorted to Jenštejn.

Geography
It lies in a flat agricultural landscape in the Central Elbe Table.

History
The first written mention of Jenštejn is from 1368. The village was founded together with a small water castle in the 14th century by Jenc of Janovice. From 1368 to 1387, it was property of the Jenštejn family. Then the owners often changed. The last person to reside in the castle was Jan Dobřichovský of Dobřichov in the years 1560–1583. After his death, the castle was seized by the royal chamber due to his debts, and in 1587 Jenštejn was annexed to the Brandýs estate. After that, the castle was abandoned and fell into disrepair.

In 1640, during the Thirty Years' War, Jenštejn and the castle were burned by the Swedish army under the command of Johan Banér. Between 1655 and 1660, the village was restored and promoted to a market town. It was a market town until the beginning of the 20th century.

Sights
Jenštejn is known for ruins of the Jenštejn Castle. Today it is owned by the municipality and is open to the public.

References

External links

Villages in Prague-East District